RCW 34 (Gum 19) - H II region and the emission nebula located in the constellation Vela. It is located approximately 22,000 light years from Earth. Named after  Australian astronomer Colin Stanley Gum.

The nebula RCW 34 is relatively dark. However, when observed using infrared wavelengths, two different areas are visible - one half of the nebula is bright, the other is dark. The bright side is the hydrogen illuminated by a nearby blue supergiant star, and dark is the place where new stars surround the central star on the other side.

The source of energy that stimulates the nebula RCW 34 to shine is a huge, extremely hot star V391 Velorum with a surface temperature of up to 30,000 °C. Because it is a variable star, it evokes violent phenomena, including discards of matter shells, affecting the composition and light emission of the RCW 34 nebula. Stars of the type V391 Velorum do not burn long enough to explode as supernovae. It can be expected that the explosion of the central star will completely change the RCW 34 nebula.

References 

Vela (constellation)
Emission nebulae
H II regions